Lordsburg is a city in and the county seat of Hidalgo County, New Mexico, United States. Hidalgo County includes the southern "bootheel" of New Mexico, along the Arizona border. The population was 2,797 at the 2010 census, down from 3,379 in 2000.

History
Lordsburg was founded in 1880 on the route of the Southern Pacific Railroad. The Continental Divide Trail starts at the Crazy Cook Monument and travels through Lordsburg. 
Local lore is that Billy the Kid washed dishes in Lordsburg hotel kitchens such as the Stratford Hotel, and La Fonda, the historic "inn at the end of the Santa Fe Trail" during his teenage years.

New Mexico state song
Lordsburg is the birthplace of the official New Mexico state song, "O Fair New Mexico". It was written by Lordsburg resident Elizabeth Garrett, the blind daughter of famed sheriff Pat Garrett. In 1917, Governor Washington Ellsworth Lindsey signed the legislation making it the official state song. In 1928, John Philip Sousa presented Governor Arthur T. Hannett and the people of New Mexico an arrangement of the state song embracing a musical story of the Indian, the cavalry, the Spanish and the Mexican.

Lordsburg Municipal Airport
In December 1938, the Lordsburg Municipal Airport (KLSB) began operation. It was the first airport in New Mexico. In 1927, Lordsburg was one of the stops on Charles Lindbergh's transcontinental Spirit of Saint Louis air tour. In the early 1950s the airport was served by the original Frontier Airlines (1950–1986) which flew DC-3s on a route from El Paso to Phoenix that included stops at Las Cruces, Deming, and Lordsburg, as well as Clifton, Safford, and Tucson, Arizona. It is owned by the City of Lordsburg and is southeast, about one mile outside the city limits.

World War II

Lordsburg held as many as 1,500 Japanese Americans in a Japanese American internment camp operated by the U.S. Army during World War II. On July 27, 1942, shortly after the Lordsburg Internment Camp was opened, Private First Class Clarence Burleson, a sentry at the facility, allegedly shot two Japanese American internees under questionable circumstances. One of the victims, Hirota Isomura, apparently died instantly. The other, Toshiro Kobata, died before dawn. After a military investigation and court-martial, Burleson was found to have lawfully killed the two men. The camp operated until July 1943. The incident inspired an episode of the new Hawaii 5-0 series, "Ho'oani Makuakane", Episode 4/9 (original air date December 13, 2013).

The camp at Lordsburg also held captured German and Italian soldiers.

Rest stop
For many years, Lordsburg has been a popular rest stop for people traveling to and from the West Coast by car on Interstate 10 and its precursor highway, U.S. Route 80. At  from downtown Los Angeles, Lordsburg can comfortably be reached by car in less than one day. As Lordsburg had one of the few motels in the Southwest that would accept black guests (El Paso being a notable exception), it was especially popular with African American travelers in the mid-20th century during the end of legal segregation.

There are 12 motels and hotels in Lordsburg. Over 300 rooms are available to guests.

Geography
Lordsburg is in northern Hidalgo County, at the intersection of Interstate 10 and U.S. Route 70. US 70 follows I-10 to the east out of Lordsburg but leads northwest  to its terminus at Globe, Arizona.

Climate
Lordsburg has a semi-arid climate (Köppen BSk), just avoiding designation as a desert climate (BWk).

Humidity in early summer is very low, but increases in late summer due to the monsoon, which, between July and early October brings the majority of the year's limited precipitation. From October temperatures cool off rapidly, and by November most mornings are below , but afternoons remains comfortable to warm all through the winter, with only 10.1 afternoons failing to reach  and only one afternoon every two years not topping freezing.

Snowfall is very rare; the median for the year is zero and the mean only ; with the heaviest snowfall between 1971 and 2000 being of  during Christmas and Boxing Days, 1987.

Demographics

As of the census of 2000, there were 3,379 people (2,398 est. 2019), 1,220 households, and 854 families residing in the city. The population density was 403.1 people per square mile (155.7/km). There were 1,414 housing units at an average density of 168.7 per square mile (65.1/km). The racial makeup of the city was 80.70% White, 0.56% African American, 0.77% Native American, 0.50% Asian, 13.97% from other races, and 3.49% from two or more races. Hispanic or Latino of any race were 74.43% of the population.
 
There were 1,220 households, out of which 36.9% had children under the age of 18 living with them, 46.5% were married couples living together, 18.6% had a female householder with no husband present, and 30.0% were non-families. 27.3% of all households were made up of individuals, and 12.4% had someone living alone who was 65 years of age or older. The average household size was 2.70 and the average family size was 3.31.

In the city, the population was spread out, with 31.9% under the age of 18, 8.5% from 18 to 24, 25.6% from 25 to 44, 18.9% from 45 to 64, and 15.0% who were 65 years of age or older. The median age was 33 years. For every 100 females, there were 94.8 males. For every 100 females age 18 and over, there were 89.4 males.

The median income for a household in the city was $21,036, and the median income for a family was $28,026. Males had a median income of $25,952 versus $18,177 for females. The per capita income for the city was $10,877. About 28.6% of families and 32.7% of the population were below the poverty line, including 47.5% of those under age 18 and 19.3% of those age 65 or over.

Cultural references
Lordsburg is the final destination in Stagecoach, the 9th greatest Western film of all time according to the American Film Institute, starring John Wayne in his breakthrough role as the Ringo Kid, and directed by John Ford. In 1995, this film was deemed "culturally, historically, or aesthetically significant" by the United States Library of Congress and selected for preservation in their National Film Registry.

Lordsburg is also the final destination in Apache Uprising, the 1965 film starring Rory Calhoun, Corinne Calvet, Lon Chaney Jr. Gene Evans and DeForest Kelley.

The town of Lordsburg is mentioned some 20 times in the movie Comanche Station, but not visited once.

Lordsburg is also cited in the 1954 film Dawn at Socorro. In it, the character played by Piper Laurie tells the Rory Calhoun character that she had seen him in Lordsburg killing someone in a shoot-out. Thus, Rory Calhoun was in two western movies that used the "town" of Lordsburg.

In the book 'When the Emperor was Divine', the father is mentioned as having been taken away to the Lordsburg internment camp during World War II.

In the book Interred with their Bones, by Jennifer Lee Carrell, the city of Lordsburg is mentioned as near the ghost town of Shakespeare, which ends up being part of the protagonist's search. At one point in the story, the characters fly into the airport in Lordsburg.

Lordsburg is cited as the place where an important event takes place in the fiercely honest and deeply empathetic experiences of a border patrol agent, in the book "The Line Becomes A River", by Francisco Cantu.

In Solar (novel), a novel by Ian McEwan, the main protagonist Michael Beard visits Lordsburg several times. In his quest for a type of experimental solar-based renewable energy production, he and his partner are building a solar power plant in Lordsburg.

Education
Lordsburg High School's mascot is the Maverick. Its school colors are orange and black. Students compete in football, volleyball, boys' basketball, girls' basketball, cheer, and boys' and girls' track and field, baseball and softball.

Media
Lordsburg once had two radio stations. During the 1960s KLHS broadcast on 950 kHz AM with 1,000 watts days. The FCC later assigned 97.7 to KXKK in the 1980s, now KPSA-FM; this station has since moved to 98.5.

Transportation

Bus
Greyhound Lines maintains a terminal in Lordsburg.

Airports
Lordsburg Municipal Airport, private, charter and military (first airport in New Mexico)
Grant County Airport,(49 miles) northeast of Lordsburg.

Major highways

Rail
Amtrak's Sunset Limited /Texas Eagle combined train route stops at Lordsburg station 3 times a week in each direction. Eastbound trains depart at 11:43am on Mondays, Thursdays, and Saturdays, while Westbound trains depart at 4:53pm on Sundays, Tuesdays, and Thursdays.
The Union Pacific Railroad's mainline and the Arizona Eastern Railway with its branch to Clifton, Arizona, serve Lordsburg.

References

External links

 Lordsburg Chamber of Commerce

Cities in Hidalgo County, New Mexico
County seats in New Mexico
Populated places established in 1880
1880 establishments in New Mexico Territory
Cities in New Mexico